An inkstone is traditional Chinese stationery. It is a stone mortar for the grinding and containment of ink. In addition to stone, inkstones are also manufactured from clay, bronze, iron, and porcelain. The device evolved from a rubbing tool used for rubbing dyes dating around 6000 to 7000 years ago.

History

Early History 
The inkstone is Chinese in origin and is used in calligraphy and painting. Extant inkstones date from early antiquity in China. 

The device evolved from a rubbing tool used for rubbing dyes dating around 6000 to 7000 years ago. The earliest excavated inkstone is dated from the 3rd century BC, and was discovered in a tomb located in modern Yunmeng, Hubei. Usage of the inkstone was popularized during the Han Dynasty.

Tang, Song, and Yuan Dynasties 
Stimulated by the social economy and culture, the demand for inkstones increased during the Tang Dynasty (618–905) and reached its height in the Song Dynasty (960–1279). Song Dynasty inkstones can be of great size and often display a delicacy of carving. Song Dynasty inkstones can also exhibit a roughness in their finishing. Dragon designs of the period often reveal an almost humorous rendition; the dragons often seem to smile. From the subsequent Yuan Dynasty, in contrast, dragons display a ferocious appearance.

Qing Dynasty 
The transition to civil rule under Kangxi Emperor in 1681 saw an increase in imperial inkstone production. Inkstones were often given as gifts, likely in part to help connect existing Chinese literati culture to the new Manchu imperial culture.

The Qianlong Emperor had his own imperial collection of inkstones catalogued into a twenty-four chapter compendium entitled Xiqing yanpu (Hsi-ch'ing yen-p'u). Many of these inkstones are housed in the National Palace Museum collection in Taipei.

Qing dynasty emperors often had their inkstones made of Songhua stones, but this choice was not popular outside of the imperial workshop. Inkstone design outside the palace developed largely in parallel with imperial inkstone design, although they occasionally intersected. Gu Erniang was the most famous inkstone-maker among Chinese scholars in the early Qing dynasty. Records indicate her inkstones were elegant and relatively simple, as was the preferred style at the time. However, by the late Qing dynasty, the inkstone market had turned to favoring highly intricate and novel designs.

Material and Construction 
Inkstones can be made from a variety of materials, such as ceramics, lacquered wood, glass, or old bricks. However, they are typically made from stones harvested specifically for inkstone-making. Different stones yield different quality ink; as such, the material of an inkstone is critical to its functionality. Inkstones made from the stones of specific quarries, and from specific caves within those quarries, are highly sought out by collectors.

Four Famous Inkstones
Four kinds of Chinese inkstones are especially noted in inkstone art history and are popularly known  as the "Four Famous Inkstones".

Duan inkstones are produced in Zhaoqing, Guangdong Province, and got its name from Duan Prefecture that governed the city during the Tang Dynasty. Duan stone is a volcanic tuff, commonly of a purple to a purple-red color. There are various distinctive markings, due to various rock materials imbedded in the stone, that create unique designs and stone eyes (inclusions) which were traditionally valued in China. A green variety of the stone was mined in the Song Dynasty. Duan inkstones are carefully categorized by the mines (k'eng) from which the raw stone was excavated. Particular mines were open only for discrete periods in history. For example, the Mazukeng mine was originally opened in the Qianlong reign (1736-1795), although reopened in modern times.
She inkstones come from She County (Anhui Province) and Wuyuan County (Jiangxi Province). Both counties were under jurisdiction of the ancient She Prefecture of Huizhou during the Tang Dynasty when the She inkstone was first made. This stone is a variety of slate and like Duan stone is categorized by the various mines from which the stone was obtained historically. It has a black color and also displays a variety of gold-like markings. She inkstones were first used during the Tang Dynasty.

Tao(he) inkstones are made from the stones found at the bottom of the Tao River in Gansu Province. These inkstones were first used during the Song Dynasty and became rapidly desired. It bears distinct markings such as bands of ripples with varying shades. The stone is crystalline and looks like jade. These stones have become increasingly rare and are difficult to find. It can easily be confused with a green Duan stone, but can be distinguished by its crystalline nature.
Chengni inkstones are ceramic-manufactured inkstones. This process began in the Tang Dynasty and is said to have originated in Luoyang, Henan.

Usage
Traditional Chinese ink is solidified into inksticks. Usually, some water is applied onto the inkstone (by means of a dropper to control the amount of water) before the bottom end of the inkstick is placed on the grinding surface and then gradually ground to produce the ink. 

More water is gradually added during the grinding process to increase the amount of ink produced, the excess flowing down into the reservoir of the inkstone where it will not evaporate as quickly as on the flat grinding surface, until enough ink has been produced for the purpose in question.
 
The Chinese grind their ink in a circular motion with the end flat on the surface whilst the Japanese push one edge of the end of the inkstick back and forth. 

Water can be stored in a water-holding cavity on the inkstone itself, as was the case for many Song Dynasty (960–1279) inkstones. The water-holding cavity or water reservoir in time became an ink reservoir on later inkstones. Water was usually kept in a ceramic container and sprinkled on the inkstone. The inkstone, together with the ink brush, inkstick and Xuan paper, are the four writing implements traditionally known as the Four Treasures of the Study.

Gallery

Notes

References 
 T.C.Lai, Treasures of a Chinese Studio, Hong Kong, 1976.
 Kitabatake Sōji and Kitabatake Gotei, Chūgoku kenzai shūsei (A Compendium on Chinese Inkstones), Tokyo, 1980.
 Kitabatake Sōji and Kitabatake Gotei, Suzuri-ishi gaku (An Inkstone Encyclopedia), Tokyo, 1977.
 Yin-ting hsi-ch'ing yen-p'u (An Imperial Catalogue of the Western Brightness Collection of Inkstones), 24 chapters,  preface 1778.

Visual arts materials
Chinese calligraphy
Chinese inventions
East Asian calligraphy
Hardstone carving
Writing implements